Peter Allen (born 18 February 1952) is a Canadian composer, organist, and keyboard player. An associate of the Canadian Music Centre and a member of the Canadian League of Composers, his compositions encompass a broad repertoire from film scores and commercial jingles to sacred music and avant-garde electroacoustic music. He has composed numerous works for CBC Radio and CBC Television.

Education and career

Born in Ottawa, Ontario, Allen was a pupil of Boyd McDonald and Robert Turner at the University of Manitoba where he earned a Bachelor of Music degree in 1975. Between 1976 and 1977 he pursued graduate studies at McGill University where his teachers included Bengt Hambraeus, Alcides Lanza, and Bruce Mather. During the 1970s he was a founding member of the contemporary concert series IZ Music, along with three other Manitoba composers; Bruce Carlson, William Pura and James Hiscott. Their concerts were regularly recorded by the CBC and broadcast on Two New Hours, CBC Radio Toronto.  Allen also worked as a pianist with the Royal Winnipeg Ballet, and was active as a keyboardist with a number of local club and rock bands. In 1980 he became organist at St. Mary's Cathedral, Winnipeg and in 1984 was appointed music director for Pope John Paul II's papal mass outdoors at Bird's Hill Park in Winnipeg, for which he was also commissioned to compose a new mass setting. From 1985 to 1986 he worked for Century 21 Studios as their in-house composer and music producer.

Allen moved to Los Angeles, California in 1986 to pursue studies in film scoring at the University of California, Los Angeles and the University of Southern California. In 1988 he moved to Vancouver British Columbia to open his own recording and sound production studio, Peter Allen Associates Inc. He has composed music for more than 100 films for American, Canadian and British film companies, including Twentieth Century Fox, Paramount Pictures, Sony Pictures, Warner Brothers, Disney, Universal Pictures, CineTel Films, The National Film Board of Canada, the CBC, LifeTime, Hallmark as well as numerous independent film producers, and has written music for various television shows and series, including a theme song for the Winnipeg Jets in 1979, the broadcast theme for the Toronto Blue Jays, the Montreal Expos, the Winning Spirit theme for the Vancouver Canucks, and also the international broadcast theme for the 1994 Commonwealth Games.  In October 2012, "Tear The Curtain", directed by Kim Collier, played on the Canadian Stage, the largest theatre stage in Canada.  "Tear The Curtain" is a simultaneous mix of live theatre and film, and features a score by Peter Allen, both in the film segments and the live segments of the production. Peter worked with Kim Collier again in 2019 to create the score for "The Full Light of Day", which played at the Luminato Festival in Toronto in 2019. In 2003 he won a Leo Award for his score for the film Flower & Garnet and in 2019 for his score for the film Truly Madly Sweetly.

Filmography

Films

Television

Video games

Theatre

Awards

References

External links

Peter Allen Associates Inc. Online
Peter Allen clips on TV Guide

1952 births
Living people
Canadian male composers
Canadian film score composers
Male film score composers
Musicians from Ottawa
University of Manitoba alumni
McGill University School of Music alumni
UCLA School of the Arts and Architecture alumni
USC Thornton School of Music alumni